Baloda is a village in the Indian state of Rajasthan. Its mandal is Surajgarh and district is Jhunjhunu.

History 
Baloda Thikana was established by Raj Shree Thakur Dalel Singh Ji Shekhawat,and named after baloda gotra of jats.Thakur Dalel singh ji shekhawat was the first jagirdar/thikanedar of Baloda Thikana with other village jagir.who migrated from pilani(dalelgarh)fort. He was the son of Raj Shree Thakur Nawal Singhji Shekhawat of Nawalgarh and grandson of Jhunjhunu Maharaja Raj Shree Thakur Shardul Singh Ji Shekhawat. Shekhawat Jagirdar of Baloda Thikana are Bhojraj ji clan (panchpana).

The village has a big Anaj Mandi. Other castes include Rajput, Jat Gurjar, Jat, Brahmin, Bania, Kumhar, Sunar, Meghwal Baloda Jat, and Shekhawat Rajput.

Infrastructure 
The village has a Bank of Baroda Branch. It is well connected with Buhana Chirawa, Satnali, Jhunjhunu. The village has a direct bus service to Jaipur. The nearest railway station is Satnali (Haryana) which is 16 km from Balonda. This is a broad gauge line that links directly to the capital of India New Delhi. Delhi is 165 km from Balonda. Balonda touches the Haryana Border at Dhana and Satnali. Currently Smt. Manoj soni is Sarpanch of baloda.

Temples 
The village has 8 main temples:
Shree Thakur-ji maharaj Temple(of shekhawat rajpariwar)
Shekhawat rajpariwar kuldevi jamwai mata ji Temple 
Shree bhani nath ji maharaj Temple  
Ganesh ji Temple
Baba Karni Nath ji maharaj Temple
baba udaidas ji temple
Balaji Temple
Shiv Temple

Education
A Government Senior Secondary School with Arts faculty is available. Sarpanch Shree Sardar Singh Shekhawat helped upgrade the village school to a secondary school in 1966 and invited Chief Minister Sh. Sukhadia to the village for this purpose.

Schools
 Government Senior Secondary school Balonda
 IT centre
Aadarsh Public school

Colleges
Nearby colleges are:
 Colleges at Surajgarh
 Umrao Singh Arya College Buhana
 Govt college at Chirawa
 Savitri Devi Girls College
 SVM College Jaisinghwas

References

Villages in Jhunjhunu district